Polpharma Starogard Gdański is a Polish basketball team, based in Starogard Gdański. The team currently plays in the Polish I Liga. In 2004, the team was promoted to the highest tier in Poland. In 2011, the club won its first trophy when it beat Anwil Włocławek 75–61 in the Polish Cup Final. Following the cup triumph, Polpharma also won the Supercup, beating previous champions Asseco Prokom Gdynia 79–78.

Players

Current roster

Trophies
Polish Cup
Champions (1): 2011
Polish Supercup
Champions (1): 2011

Season by season

Logos

Notable players

References

Basketball teams in Poland
Starogard County
Sport in Pomeranian Voivodeship
Basketball teams established in 1997
1997 establishments in Poland